Dontikurru is a village in Katrenikona Mandal, located in Dr. B.R. Ambedkar Konaseema district of the Indian state of Andhra Pradesh.

The main occupation of the villagers is farming. Most of the places in the village are filled with paddy fields. Also, there is a certain amount of Aquaculture going on. The main source of employment in this village is to work as farm labourers.

References 

Villages in Konaseema district